The Azerbaijan Cup 2006–07 was the 15th season of the annual cup competition in Azerbaijan with the final taking place on 27 May 2007. Sixteen teams competed in this year's competition. Qarabağ were the defending champions.

Preliminary round
The first legs were played on the 6 September with the seconds leg taking place on 9 September 2006.

|}

First round
The first legs were played on September 11 and 12 while the second legs were played on October 16 and 17, 2006.

|}

Round of 16
The first legs were played on November 19 and 20 while the second legs were played on December 1 and 2, 2006.

|}

Quarterfinals
The first legs were played on February 25 and 26 while the second legs were played on March 3, 2007.

|}

Semifinals
The first legs were played on April 11 and 12, 2007. The second legs were played on April 21 and 22, 2007.

Final

References

External links
 Official page 
 Soccerway
 Match Results

Azerbaijan Cup seasons
Azerbaijan Cup 2006-07
Azerbaijan Cup 2006-07